Acheloos (ancient Greek: Ἀχελῷος) may refer to:

 Achelous River, a major river in Greece
 Achelous River (disambiguation), other rivers of the name in Greece
 Achelous, a river deity in Greek mythology
 Acheloos (municipality), a municipal unit in the Karditsa regional unit, Greece

See also
 Achelous (disambiguation)